The 2012 Asia Cup, was held in Hefei, China, between 27 October and 1 November 2012. It was the 15th Edition of this competition. The tournament was organized by the Confederation of Asia Roller Sports (CARS) and was part of the Roller Hockey Asia Cup.

Men's Championship
Participating Men's National teams included Macau, Taiwan, India and Australia.

Women's Championship

Participating Women's National teams included Macau, Taiwan and India.

External links
 FIRS Organizational chart
CIRH website
 India Federation of Roller Sports
 Hong Kong Federation of Roller Sports
 South Korean Federation of Roller Sports
 Japan Roller Sports Federation
 Hóquei Macau
 Roller Hockey links worldwide

Asian Championship
Roller hockey competitions
Asian Roller Hockey Championship, 2012
2012 in Asian sport
International roller hockey competitions hosted by China